NongJungJo (농중조, Nongjungjo) is a 1926 Korean film. Future writing/directing/acting star Na Woon-gyu appeared in this film just before his breakthrough in Arirang (1926). Kato Kyohei served as director of photography both for this and other well-known Korean movies of the 1920s.

Plot summary
The story is a melodrama concerning two lovers who are kept apart by the woman's strict parents, who lock her in her house.

References

Pre-1948 Korean films
Korean black-and-white films
Korean silent films